Netaji Subhas Medical College and Hospital, established in 2020, is a private medical college and hospital located at Bihta, Patna, Bihar. This college offers the Bachelor of Medicine and Surgery (MBBS) courses and has an annual intake capacity of 100. This college is affiliated with the Aryabhatta Knowledge University and recognized by the National Medical Commission.

See also

References

Medical colleges in Bihar
Educational institutions established in 2020
2020 establishments in Bihar
Hospitals in Bihar
Colleges affiliated to Aryabhatta Knowledge University